Macey Ellen Cruthird (born November 12, 1992) is an American actress best known for her role as Hayley Shanowski in the ABC sitcom Hope & Faith.

Career
Macey has trained in numerous acting and auditioning workshops in Los Angeles and her hometown of Frisco, Texas. She was cast in two pilots for Warner Brothers, "House Blend" and "The Misadventures of Fiona Plum," before landing her spot on Hope & Faith which she played for its entire three season run. She's also done numerous commercials, including Toyota, McDonald's, TJ Maxx and others, as well as print work.

Macey made her feature film debut in the independent family film, "Come Away Home," which premiered during the summer of 2005 and starred Paul Dooley, Martin Mull, Thomas Gibson and Lea Thompson. Additionally, she had the opportunity to work with one of her best friends, actress Jordan-Claire Green, in the movie.

Macey had a recurring role on the sitcom Two and a Half Men, as Megan, Jake's girlfriend.

She was cast in the sitcom, Deeply Irresponsible as Alison Atlin in 2007, however, the show failed to air and remained an unaired pilot.  She was cast as Maddie in the Kelsey Grammer-led sitcom Hank and filmed the original pilot, however, she was replaced by Jordan Hinson for the role after they decided to age the character.

Personal life
Cruthird has an older sister named Bailey, who is a singer and also guest starred in one episode of Hope & Faith. Cruthird went to St. Joseph's School in Yorkville, New York. Macey's other skills and hobbies include singing, dancing, piano, playing guitar, snow skiing and outdoor sports of all kinds, especially water sports. She is an avid animal lover and has a Maltese puppy, Gidget.

In 2004, Cruthird was nominated for the Young Artist Award Best Performance in a TV Series (Comedy or Drama) - Young Actress Age Ten or Younger for Hope & Faith.

In 2006, Cruthird was nominated for the Young Artist Award Best Performance in a TV Series (Comedy) - Supporting Young Actress for Hope & Faith.

Filmography

Television

Film

Award Nominations

References

External links

1992 births
Actresses from Texas
American child actresses
American film actresses
American television actresses
Living people
People from Baytown, Texas
21st-century American actresses